Alice Harlekinden Lord (later Landon, February 4, 1902 – July 13, 2000) was an American diver who competed in the 1920 Summer Olympics.

She was born in Philadelphia and died in Ormond Beach, Florida. She was the wife of Richmond Landon.

In 1920 she was eliminated in the first round of the 10 metre platform event, as part of the first U.S. woman's swimming team at the Olympics.

She appeared at the 1984 Los Angeles Olympics, leading the American athletes, and at age 94, carried the torch for a stint in Florida prior to the 1996 Atlanta games.

See also
 List of members of the International Swimming Hall of Fame

References

External links
profile

1902 births
2000 deaths
American female divers
Olympic divers of the United States
Divers at the 1920 Summer Olympics
20th-century American women
20th-century American people